Brings are a band from Germany which perform most songs in the local dialect of Cologne, Kölsch. Founded in 1990, they established themselves playing rock music; their lyrics are performed in Kölsch and, since 1995, also in standard German. After the successful single  (2001) they specialized in Cologne party hits.

History 
Although the name resembles the German language equivalent of the imperative "bring it!", Brings is just the family name of three of the founders of the band, one of whom is also the band manager and father of two of the currently active members, .

Brings was formed in 1990 by the brothers Peter and Stephan Brings, Harry Alfter and Matthias Gottschalk. Today, the formation consists of Peter Brings (vocals, guitar), Stephan Brings (bass, vocals), Kai Engel (keyboard, vocals), Harry Alfter (guitar, vocals) and Christian Blüm (drums).

They debuted in 1991 with the album  ("Two kinds of people") which was an attempt to distance themselves from the traditional Cologne carnival in order not to be pigeonholed. The single release  ("Just the two of us") reached No. 56 in the German Charts. They played their first successful concerts, opened up for the Simple Minds, AC/DC, Tom Petty and performed at the rock festival Rock am Ring. In 1995, Brings began to publish albums not only in Kölsch but in standard German ( – faith, love, hope).

Throughout their career, the band has been politically dedicated, one of the best known examples is their leading rols in the Arsch huh, Zäng ussenander campaign against right-wing extremist violence in Germany. Their 1997 song  (strong: "A handful to eat") broached the issue of refugees seeking a better live.

The 10th anniversary of the band came with some transitions – Brings broke up with their label (EMI) – and their next album and single release  brought a major style change. Leaving rock music behind, Brings eventually began focusing on carnival and party songs, a strategy that lead to ultimate success, mainly in the Rhineland area.

In 2004, the song  ("Copulate, cards, dance") caused a small scandal in the rather conservative scene of the "official" Cologne carnival – however, attempts to censor the song or prevent the band to play it on carnival events were not successful.

In 2011, the 15th album  ("This is cool/hot") reached No. 7 of the German album charts. Anniversary concerts in 2011 and 2016 took place in the RheinEnergieStadion with  fans.

Discography

Records

Studio records

Live recordings 

More live albums
 1997: Live
 2013:

Compilations 

Other compilations
 2007: 
 2007: Best Of
 2011: 
 2011:

EPs 
 1991: 
 1996:

Singles

Charts

Other singles 
 1991: 
 1991: 
 1992: 
 1992: 
 1992: 
 1993: 
 1993: 
 1993: 
 1993: 
 1995: 
 1995: 
 1995: 
 1997: 
 1997: 
 1997: 
 1999: 
 1999: 
 1999: 
 2004: 
 2005: 
 2005: 
 2006: 
 2008: 
 2010: 
 2011: 
 2012:  (feat. Lukas Podolski)
 2013: 
 2014:  (Eko Fresh feat. Brings)
 2017:  (feat. )
 2019:

Videos

Video records 
 2007: Live
 2011:

Music videos

Box sets 
 2011:

Further reading

Audio book

See also
 Bläck Fööss
 Klaus Heuser

References

External links 
 
 https://www.offiziellecharts.de/suche?artist_search=Brings&do_search=do

German rock music groups